Choreutis aegyptiaca is a species of moth of the family Choreutidae. It is found in the India, Nepal, Israel, Saudi Arabia, the United Arab Emirates, Yemen, Egypt, La Réunion, Nepal, Oman, Uganda, Namibia and South Africa.

The larvae have been recorded feeding on Ficus sycomorus, Ficus infectoria, Ficus glomerata, Ficus reflexa and Ficus benghalensis.

References

Choreutis
Insects of Uganda
Insects of the Arabian Peninsula
Moths of Africa
Insects of Namibia
Moths described in 1867